Nabas, officially the Municipality of Nabas (Aklanon: Banwa it Nabas; Hiligaynon: Banwa sang Nabas), is a 4th class municipality in the province of Aklan, Philippines. Nabas serves as the arrival gateway of Boracay Airport. According to the 2020 census, it has a population of 40,632 people, making it the fifth most populous town in Aklan Province..

History

Accounts about the earliest community of Nabas are uncertain but the initial documentation for the town's existence was recorded in 1845. Facing the Sibuyan Sea, the town started as a small coastal village referred to as Barrio Alimbo which extends to the hills and mountains to the west. This small community occupies the floodplains of Alimbo River where the village derived its name. Fishing and farming is the primary source of livelihood, even today except for the hunting which was common on that time because of the abundances of wild pig, monkey and deer in the area.

Before, the town was part of the municipality of Ibajay under the jurisdiction of Capiz Province. Ibajay's municipal boundary was so vast but with poor road system.

The developing populaces whose tongue and customs diverge from those of the eastern community build awareness amongst people of the west. The invasion of migrants from the nearby province of Antique continued that further emphasized the difference in dialect and culture to some extent. In 1853, their notion of a separate municipality for better living and independence serves as the foundation for taking apart of Alimbo in concert with its adjoining barrios of Nagustan, Panaytayon (Toledo), Gibon, Namao (Rizal), Kabangrosan (Union), and Pakilawa (Unidos) ceased to be a barrio to form a new municipality inevitably.
The municipality was formed in 1854 and named Navas, after Governor Nava of the province of Capiz who came to inspect the area before its creation.

In 1861, the residents of Carabao Island (locally known as Hambil Island) chose to be annexed to the municipality of Navas, Capiz following the abolition of the Pueblo de Cabalian in Tablas Island. The annexation continued until 1897 when residents of Carabao Island voted to join the municipality of Looc, Romblon.

The Cartilla System, an early teaching methods that dominantly use the letter "b" than "v" caused the variable spelling of "Navas" and "Nabas". In 1906, the Municipal Council in a resolution approved by unanimous vote adopted the name Nabas as the official name.

Recently, Nabas is currenty applying for cityhood making it the third in the province after neighboring Malay and the provincial capital Kalibo.

Geography
Nabas is a coastal town located east of the town of Malay at the north-west tip of Panay Island called Northwest Panay Peninsula. It bounded on the north by Sibuyan Sea; on the south by Pandan, Antique; east by Ibajay; and west by Malay.

According to the Philippine Statistics Authority, the municipality has a land area of  constituting  of the  total area of Aklan.

Landscape

The Municipality of Nabas is considered as rolling terrain and rugged terrain land topographic formation. It has an elongated land area situated along the Northwestern Panay Peninsula, with 21-kilometer coastline facing Sibuyan Sea, and with such a large span of municipal waters, approximately 300 square kilometers.

This town features natural wonders both on the mountains with its natural cold springs, caves and tiny water falls, and the sea which boast of crystal clear waters, coral reefs, and from grey or white sand to pebbly shores.

Nabas has one of the last remaining low elevation intact rainforest that is home to various endemic flora and fauna.

Climate

Barangays
Nabas is politically subdivided into 20 barangays. 11 of them are coastal barangays and 9 are landlocked barangays.  12 of these 20 barangays are located along the highway.

Demographics

The population of Nabas has grown dramatically for the past decade. It holds the record of fastest growing population in the whole province of Aklan covering 2011–2015.

Language

The residents of Nabas speaks Nabasnon, a variant of Karay-a and quite similar to Onhan Language of the islands of Hambil and Southern Tablas in Romblon Province. The eastern half of the municipality has the accent influenced and similar to Karay-a, spoken by the neighboring Antiqueños particularly the people from the towns Libertad, Pandan, and Sebaste of Antique. Those in the western half speak similar to the dialect currently regarded as Malaynon with softer intonation. Aklanon, Hiligaynon, and Tagalog are also used as regional languages.

Economy

Nabas, a 4th class municipality, is noted for its hat and mat industry made of indigenous bariw leaves which abound on the hillsides and plain lowlands of the town. It is likewise a farming and fishing community with its vast lowlands and long shoreline.  While the cost of marine commodity has soared due to the proximity of Nabas to Boracay Island, the fishermen remained impoverished.

One of the most imposing presence in Nabas is PetroWind Energy Inc. 36-megawatt wind farm in Brgy Pawa. An array of gigantic wind turbines lined-up along a mountain ridge aimed to spur tourism and add livelihood in the area is the biggest single venture in the province of Aklan.

The town serves as a satellite area for the expansion of tourism from the traditional town of Malay to expand and stretch developments to Nabas. Construction project in Brgy. Union is a hotel owned by Marriott and San Miguel Corporation. This facility will surely be a gamechanger that can catapult the economic growth of Nabas and become the next big thing in Panay Island.

Aside from Marriott, more developments are expected in the municipality with the new arrival terminal building of Boracay Airport in Brgy Union and Cruise Port terminal project in Brgy Unidos.

With all of these investments in Nabas, it is not impossible that in the near future, the town will transform from a mere fourth class municipality into a bustling and modern city in the Province of Aklan.

Culture

The Nabas Bariw Festival is celebrated to commemorate the feast day of Saint Isidore the Farmer, the town's patron saint. It is celebrated annually from May 12 to 15. This celebration showcases the town's hat, mat and other bariw products as well as the town's unique tourism sites and natural attractions.

During this affair, various skills in mat, hat and bag making and designing are demonstrated. Among the events is a contest to produce the biggest hat and mat contest. The festival is highlighted by continuous street dancing by folks from the town's 20 barangays dressed in colorful bariw costumes accompanied by indigenous bamboo instruments.

The festival is intended to promote the town's cottage industry, which is a thriving livelihood activity in Nabas. It also promotes the town's well preserved cold spring resorts, lagoons, long winding coastline, rivers, and low elevation intact forest, home to various endemic flora and fauna.

Gallery

References

External links

 [ Philippine Standard Geographic Code]
 

Municipalities of Aklan